Reyes Murillo Airport  is an airport serving Nuquí, a Pacific coast town in the Chocó Department of Colombia.

The Nuqui non-directional beacon (Ident: NQI) is located on the field.

Airlines and destinations

See also

Transport in Colombia
List of airports in Colombia

References

External links
OpenStreetMap - Nuquí
OurAirports - Nuquí
FallingRain - Nuquí Airport

Airports in Colombia
Buildings and structures in Chocó Department